Zygoseius is a genus of mites in the superfamily Eviphidoidea. There are about nine described species in Zygoseius.

This genus is currently unplaced within the superfamily, but was formerly in the family Pachylaelapidae.

Species
These nine species belong to the genus Zygoseius:
 Zygoseius alveolaris Karg, 1998
 Zygoseius incisus Karg, 1998
 Zygoseius lindquisti Berlese, 1917
 Zygoseius macroporus Karg & Schorlemmer, 2009
 Zygoseius margaritatus Karg & Schorlemmer, 2009
 Zygoseius ovatus Karg, 1998
 Zygoseius papaver Berlese, 1917
 Zygoseius setoporus Karg, 1998
 Zygoseius triramuli Karg & Schorlemmer, 2009

References

Pachylaelapidae
Articles created by Qbugbot